Turkey Creek is a stream in Johnson County, Iowa, in the United States.

Turkey Creek was so named in the 1830s because a hunting ground for wild turkeys was located there.

See also
List of rivers of Iowa

References

Rivers of Johnson County, Iowa
Rivers of Iowa